The Oman Journal of Ophthalmology is a peer-reviewed open-access medical journal published on behalf of the Oman Ophthalmic Society and Chief Editor is Dr. Rashid Al-Saidi. It publishes articles on the subject of ophthalmology and vision science.

The journal is indexed with Caspur, DOAJ, EBSCO, EMR Index Medicus, Expanded Academic ASAP, JournalSeek, Global Health, Google Scholar, Health & Wellness Research Center, Health Reference Center Academic, Hinari, Index Copernicus, OpenJGate, ProQuest, PubMed, SCOLOAR, SIIC databases, and Ulrich's Periodicals Directory.

External links 
 
 

Open access journals
English-language journals
Triannual journals
Publications established in 2008
Medknow Publications academic journals
Ophthalmology journals
Academic journals associated with learned and professional societies